The SCAR Southern Ocean Continuous Plankton Recorder (SO-CPR) Survey was established in 1991 by the Australian Antarctic Division,of Environment, Water Heritage and the Arts, to map the spatial-temporal patterns of zooplankton and then to use the sensitivity of plankton to environmental change as early warning indicators of the health of the Southern Ocean. It also serves as reference for other Southern Ocean and Antarctic monitoring programs.  

Several countries collaborate in the survey providing vessels to tow Continuous Plankton Recorders (CPRs) in a near circum-Antarctic survey.  Tows conducted between Hobart and the French Antarctic station Dumont d’Urville are also conducted in collaboration with the IMOSAustralian Continuous Plankton Recorder Survey.  The SO-CPR Survey is supported by the Scientific Committee on Antarctic Research and its Expert Group on Continuous Plankton Research, which helps promote and develop the survey.  

The CPRs are towed from research and supply vessels.  The CPR is towed at about 10 metres below the surface and for about 450 nautical miles (830 km) per tow. The plankton enters a small opening in the device and is trapped and preserved between two layers of silk mesh.  These vessels also collect at the same time underway data such as sea surface temperature, salinity, fluorometry, light and other oceanographic-meteorological parameters.  All plankton in five nautical mile (9 km) equivalent sections are identified to the lowest possible taxa, usually species and counted.  Antarctic krill and other euphausiids are identified to developmental stage.  Plankton counts are combined with averaged environmental data for each .  

 Approximately 40-50 tows are made each year.  More than 80 tows were completed in 2007-08 International Polar Year in support of the Census of Antarctic Marine Life.   of data have been collected since 1991, producing more than 27,000 samples for 200+ taxa coupled with environmental data.  Most data comes from the October to April period.  Few ships operate in the region during winter but some winter tows south of Australia have been made.  

Use of the SO-CPR data for research purposes is encouraged.  Data are made available soon after the CPR samples are processed.  Data are held at the Australian Antarctic Data Centre and at the SCAR Marine Biodiversity Information Network.

References

 Hosie, G.W., Fukuchi, M. and Kawaguchi, S. (2003) Development of the Southern Ocean Continuous Plankton Recorder Survey.  Progress in Oceanography 58 (2-4), 263-283.
 Hosie, G.W. (2004) Plankton survey uses old technology to monitor the future. Australian Antarctic Magazine Issue 6,  15-17. click here to download a pdf of this paper

External links 
 Southern Ocean Continuous Plankton Recorder Survey
 Australian Continuous Plankton Recorder Survey
 Sir Alister Hardy Foundation for Ocean Science

Planktology